Baisari High School is an educational institution of Baisari in Banaripara Upazila, Bangladesh. It was once co-educational, but is now a boys school. 

High schools in Bangladesh
1880 establishments in India
Schools in Barisal District